South Fork Township is an inactive township in Monroe County, in the U.S. state of Missouri.

South Fork Township was established in 1834, taking its name from South Fork Salt River.

References

Townships in Missouri
Townships in Monroe County, Missouri